Vincenzo Dall'Osso (22 February 1929 – 11 September 2015) was an Italian boxer. He competed in the men's bantamweight event at the 1952 Summer Olympics.

References

External links
 

1929 births
2015 deaths
Italian male boxers
Olympic boxers of Italy
Boxers at the 1952 Summer Olympics
People from Imola
Bantamweight boxers
Sportspeople from the Metropolitan City of Bologna
20th-century Italian people